Zurab Girchi Japaridze (born 1 January 1976) is a Georgian politician and co-founder of a right-libertarian party called Girchi. On 26 December 2020 he founded new political party Girchi - More Freedom.

Japaridze graduated from the Tbilisi State Medical University in 1999 and Georgian Institute of Public Affairs (GIPA) in 2005. Since 1998, he has worked for various Western-funded assistance programs for Georgia. He was a professor at the GIPA from 2005 to 2011 and at the Free University of Tbilisi since 2011. From 2010 to 2012 he was also a columnist for the Tabula magazine. 

Japaridze started his political career in 2012 when he joined the United National Movement party (UNM). In June 2013, he was one of the candidates for the 2013 UNM presidential nomination. In 2012–2016 Japaridze was the member of the Parliament of Georgia of the 8th convocation. He served as the UNM's executive secretary, but left the party in May 2015.

In 2016, Japaridze, with four other lawmakers who left the UNM, established a right-libertarian party called Girchi. It emerged as one of the strongest supporters of the legalization of cannabis in Georgia. In 2018, Japaridze run in the Georgian presidential election, receiving 2.26% of the total number of votes. In 2020, he was elected as a member of the parliament, although renounced his mandate after leaving the party. In December 2020, Japaridze founded new political party Girchi - More Freedom.

2018 Presidential Elections
2018 On 16 April, Zurab Japaridze, confirmed that he would be candidate of "Girchi" on 2018 presidential elections, candidate. During the 2018 presidential election, Japaridze posted his own election banners on the porn site Pornhub. Users saw two banners with these captions on the site: "More sex, more freedom" and "I do not promise to increase the size." Girchi cites low budget spending as the reason for placing their own ads on the site.

Political views 
Japaridze adheres to the libertarian and strong pro-Western views. Japaridze has been a long time proponent of Georgia's membership in North Atlantic Treaty Organization and the European Union. Japaridze's economic policies are focused on the deregulation of the market and the development of macroeconomic potential in the country. Since becoming the member of the Parliament, Japaridze has been actively advocating for low taxes, small government, government decentralization, and privatization of state-owned property. Japaridze also supports marijuana legalization in Georgia.

References

External links
 
  Articles by Zurab Japaridze

Living people
1976 births
United National Movement (Georgia) politicians
New Political Center — Girchi politicians
Atheists from Georgia (country)
Members of the Parliament of Georgia
Educators from Georgia (country)
Journalists from Georgia (country)
Tbilisi State Medical University alumni
Libertarians from Georgia (country)